General Motors Research Laboratories are the part of General Motors responsible for creation of the first known operating system (GM-NAA I/O) in 1955 and contributed to the first mechanical heart, the Dodrill-GMR, successfully used while performing open heart surgery.

See also
Multiple Console Time Sharing System

References

External links
General Motors Research Laboratories site. Domain is one of the first .com domains.

General Motors subsidiaries